Anu Aga (born 3 August 1942) is an Indian billionaire businesswoman and social worker who led Thermax, an energy and environment engineering business, as its chairperson from 1996 to 2004. She was among the eight richest Indian women, and in 2007 was part of 40 richest Indians by net worth according to Forbes magazine. She was awarded with the Mumbai Women of the Decade Achievers Award by ALL Ladies League, the all ladies wing of ASSOCHAM.

After retiring from Thermax, she took to social work, and in 2010 she was awarded the Padma Shri for Social Work by the Government of India. She is currently Chairperson of Teach For India.
She was nominated to Rajya Sabha, the Upper House of Indian Parliament on 26 April 2012, by President Pratibha Patil.

Early life and education 

Anu Aga was born to a Parsi Zoroastrian family on 3 August 1942 in Bombay.

She graduated with a B.A. in Economics from St Xavier's College, Mumbai, and with a post graduation in medical and psychiatric social work from the prestigious Tata Institute of Social Sciences (TISS), Mumbai. She had also been a Fulbright Scholar and studied in the United States for four months.

Career
Anu started her career in Thermax in 1985 and later headed its human resources division from 1991 to 1996. After the death of husband, Rohinton Aga, she took over as Chairperson of Thermax, retiring in 2004 and succeeded by her daughter and company vice-chairperson, Meher Pudumjee. Anu has since remained on company's board of directors, and involved with social work.

As a Member of Parliament in the Rajya Sabha she served on the following committees
 Member, Committee on Personnel, Public Grievances, Law and Justice (May 2012 - May 2014) and (Sept. 2014 - Present)
 Member, Parliamentary Forum on Children (Aug. 2012 - May 2014)
 Member, Committee on Empowerment of Women (Sept. 2012 - Sept. 2013)
 Member, Committee on Commerce (Aug. - Dec. 2012)

Awards
Mumbai Women of the Decade Achievers Award Anu Aga

'Power Brands: Bharatiya Manavata Vikas Puraskar (BMVP) – Edition 2019' for business leadership and philanthropy.

Padma Shri award in 2010.

Lifetime Achievement award by MAEER’s MIT group, Pune in 2015.

Personal life
Anu was married to Rohinton Aga, a graduate from the Harvard Business School and gave birth to a daughter, Meher, and son, Kurush. Rohinton died in 1996 of a massive stroke, and a little over a year later, her son Kurush died at the age of 25 years. Today, Arnavaz 'Anu' Aga lives in Pune, Maharashtra.

Her daughter, Meher Pudumjee is the current Chairperson of Thermax, taking over from her mother in 2004. She is a post-graduate in chemical engineering from the Imperial College of Science and Technology, London and joined Thermax in September 1990, and is also a member of the Confederation of Indian Industry's (CII) Family Business Forum and the Young Indians (YI).

References

External links
 Anu Aga – Director, Profile Thermax India.

Indian billionaires
1942 births
Living people
Businesspeople from Mumbai
Indian women educational theorists
St. Xavier's College, Mumbai alumni
Recipients of the Padma Shri in social work
Indian social workers
Businesspeople from Pune
Members of National Advisory Council, India
Nominated members of the Rajya Sabha
Indian women business executives
Women in Maharashtra politics
Parsi people
20th-century Indian educational theorists
20th-century Indian businesspeople
20th-century Indian women scientists
21st-century Indian women politicians
21st-century Indian politicians
Indian business executives
21st-century Indian businesspeople
21st-century Indian businesswomen
20th-century Indian businesswomen
Women members of the Rajya Sabha
Social workers from Maharashtra
Women educators from Maharashtra
Educators from Maharashtra
Businesswomen from Maharashtra
Tata Institute of Social Sciences alumni
20th-century women educators